Mario G. Pino (born September 8, 1961, in Wilmington, Delaware) is a retired jockey in American Thoroughbred horse racing. Raised on a farm, he began his riding career in 1978 at Delaware Park in Wilmington. Over the years, he has chosen to be based at race tracks close to home and family and has won a number of riding titles at venues in the Delaware, Maryland, and Virginia areas. He rode his first winner aboard Ed's Desire on January 16, 1979, at the now-defunct Bowie Race Track in Bowie, Maryland.

On July 7, 2002, Pino won seven races on a single day at Colonial Downs in New Kent, Virginia, and on October 25, 2003, had a six-win day at Laurel Park Racecourse in Laurel, Maryland. He has twice ridden in the Preakness Stakes, finishing third in 2007 aboard Hard Spun. In his debut in the Kentucky Derby on May 5, 2007, Pino rode the colt to a second-place finish and then was third in the Preakness Stakes. After winning the King's Bishop Stakes and the Kentucky Cup Classic Stakes Pino rode Hard Spun to a second-place finish in that year's Breeders' Cup Classic.

On November 7, 2007, Pino reached 6,000 career wins when he rode Pass Play to victory at Laurel Park Racecourse. On October 20, 2021, he became the tenth jockey in North America to win 7,000 races when his mount Enjoy the Music won a claiming race at Presque Isle Downs & Casino in Pennsylvania. The following day — the closing day of the season at Presque Isle — he told The Blood-Horse that he would retire following that day's races. With one more win at Presque Isle, Pino retired with 7,001 wins and career earnings in excess of $131 million.

Year-end charts

References

 March 24, 2007 article on Mario Pino by Jack Ireland of The News Journal at Delawareonline.com

1961 births
Living people
American jockeys
Sportspeople from Wilmington, Delaware
American people of Italian descent